Bakersfield, California, held a general election for mayor on June 7, 2016 and November 8, 2016. It saw the election of Karen Goh.

Municipal elections in California are officially non-partisan.

Results

First round

Runoff

References 

Bakersfield
Mayoral elections in Bakersfield, California
Bakersfield